The 2021 FC Tobol season was the 23rd successive season that the club played in the Kazakhstan Premier League, the highest tier of association football in Kazakhstan. Tobol finished the season as Champions, reached the semifinals of the Kazakhstan Cup, won the Super Cup and were knocked out of the Europa Conference League at Third Qualifying Round by Žilina.

Season events
On 18 February, Tobol announced the signing of Yegor Tsuprikov from Shakhter Karagandy, Askhat Tagybergen and Elguja Lobjanidze from Kaisar, and Toni Silva from Taraz. Also on 18 February, Serhiy Malyi signed a new contract with the club until the end of the 2021 season.

On 1 March, Tobol announced that they had signed Dušan Jovančić on loan from Çaykur Rizespor.

On 28 March, Tobol announced the signing of Nemanja Nikolić on a free transfer after he'd left Al Raed.

On 16 April, Tobol announced the signing of Zoran Tošić on a free transfer after he'd left Taizhou Yuanda.

On 17 June, Grigori Babayan left Tobol by mutual consent and was appointed by CSKA Moscow as a member of their coaching staff. The following day, Tobol confirmed Alexander Moskalenko as Acting Head Coach.

On 29 June, Oralkhan Omirtayev left Tobol after his contract was ended by mutual agreement.

On 1 July, Tobol announced the signing of Bagdat Kairov from Ordabasy, with Rúben Brígido also joining from Ordabasy the following day, and Carlos Fonseca leaving the club after his contract expired.

On 7 July, Tobol announced the return of Dušan Jovančić on an 18-month contract from Çaykur Rizespor, after his previous loan deal had ended at the end of June.

On 19 July, Tobol announced the signing of Igor Sergeev from Aktobe, after his previous loan deal had ended at the end of June.

On 30 July, Tobol Nemanja Nikolić left Tobol by mutual consent.

Squad

On loan

Transfers

In

Loans in

Released

Friendlies

Competitions

Overview

Super Cup

Premier League

Results summary

Results by round

Results

League table

Kazakhstan Cup

Group stage

Knockout stages

UEFA Europa Conference League

Qualifying rounds

Squad statistics

Appearances and goals

|-
|colspan="16"|Players away from Tobol on loan:
|-
|colspan="16"|Players who left Tobol during the season:

|}

Goal scorers

Clean sheets

Disciplinary record

References

External links
Official Website

FC Tobol seasons
Tobol
Tobol